Liberty Township is one of the twenty townships of Darke County, Ohio, United States. The 2010 census found 1,071 people in the township, 871 of whom lived in the unincorporated portions of the township.

Geography
Located in the southwestern part of the county, it borders the following townships:
Washington Township - north
Greenville Township - northeast
Neave Township - east
Butler Township - southeast corner
Harrison Township - south
Franklin Township, Wayne County, Indiana - southwest
Greensfork Township, Randolph County, Indiana - west

The village of Palestine is located in central Liberty Township.

Name and history
One of twenty-five Liberty Townships statewide,  it was originally named German Township, but its name was changed to Liberty Township in the 1910s.

German Township was formed from parts of Harrison and Washington counties in 1820.  The first settler within its bounds was James Cloyd, who arrived six years before the township's organization.  The first school in the township was established near Palestine in 1820, while the first church (a Lutheran congregation) was built in 1826.

One of German Township's most distinctive features was Tampico, an African-American settlement founded in 1822 and platted in 1850.  Located in the northwestern part of the township, its earliest residents were freeborn African Americans from Rockingham County, Virginia who moved to Ohio after the county evicted all freeborn African Americans.  In 1914, Tampico and the surrounding rural areas supported four schools and two churches.

Government
The township is governed by a three-member board of trustees, who are elected in November of odd-numbered years to a four-year term beginning on the following January 1. Two are elected in the year after the presidential election and one is elected in the year before it. There is also an elected township fiscal officer, who serves a four-year term beginning on April 1 of the year after the election, which is held in November of the year before the presidential election. Vacancies in the fiscal officership or on the board of trustees are filled by the remaining trustees.  The current trustees are Larry Helmer, Cutis Hiatt, and Raymond Mendenhall, and the clerk is Deborah Kuhnle.

References

External links
County website

Townships in Darke County, Ohio
Townships in Ohio